Norham High School is a coeducational secondary school located in North Shields, Tyne and Wear, England.

It is a foundation school administered by North Tyneside Metropolitan Borough Council, and offers GCSEs, BTECs and Cambridge Nationals as programmes of study for pupils.

Notable former pupils
Shaun Prendergast, actor
Michael Thomas, linguist

References

External links
Norham High School official website

Secondary schools in the Metropolitan Borough of North Tyneside
Foundation schools in the Metropolitan Borough of North Tyneside